ASKAP J173608.2–321635 is an unidentified astronomical radio source sending "radio signals … from the direction of the centre of the galaxy". It is nicknamed "Andy's Object" after its discoverer, Ziteng (Andy) Wang, of the University of Sydney in Australia. The object was detected using the Australian Square Kilometre Array Pathfinder  and MeerKAT radio telescopes. It is not visible to "the most powerful non-radio telescopes" and was detected six times between 2020 January and 2020 September. This may be a new class of object because no counterpart has been detected at multiple wavelengths, which "rules
out flaring stars, binary systems, NSs, GRBs, or supernovae as its source". The radio emissions have a high level of polarization, suggesting scatter as a result of a black hole.

References

Scorpius (constellation)
University of Sydney
Astronomical radio sources